Johan Heinrich (Joop) Doderer (28 August 1921 – 22 September 2005) was a Dutch actor, well known for his role as the tramp Swiebertje in the eponymous television series. The series ran for 17 seasons between 1955 and 1975, and was broadcast by the NCRV. Beside the role as Swiebertje, Doderer played in dozens of radio and television programs, he played the role of Alfred Doolittle in My Fair Lady, acted in Dutch and English movies, and appeared on stage in comedies, musicals, cabaret and dramas.

Biography
Doderer was born in Velsen, but brought up in Amsterdam. After finishing the Hogereburgerschool, he persuaded his parents to let him take acting lessons. In 1939, aged 18, the Amsterdam acting school rejected him for 'lack of talent'. Instead, he started his acting career as an extra at the Nederlandsch Toneel, which enabled him to study actors like Cor van der Lugt Melsert.

After World War II, he played in many comedies and musicals. For seven years, he was part of the ensemble of Wim Sonneveld, where he met his first wife Conny Stuart. He also acted in some movies (Het Wonderlijke leven van Willem Parel, 1959) and featured on the radio (De bonte dinsdagavondtrein and Koek en ei). From the 1950s onwards, Doderer was a star. He often ad-libbed on stage, to the amusement of the audience, but not of his co-players. At age 52, he married 21-year-old Ester. Together they had two children.

Between 1955 and 1975 he played Swiebertje on television. In 2001, the series was given the one-time-only Signaal award for the best television show in the past 50 years by the Dutch television viewers. Doderer was quite proud of his fame as Swiebertje, although it took him many years after the end of the series to look back positively (see below). In 2003, a bust of Swiebertje was placed in the town of Oudewater, where many of the outdoor scenes of the series were shot.

Doderer was a Ridder in de Orde van Oranje-Nassau (Knight of the Order of Orange-Nassau).

Doderer died in a nursing home in Roelofarendsveen and is buried at Zorgvlied cemetery.

Swiebertje-effect
Being identified with Swiebertje hampered Doderer when playing serious roles after 1975, to the point where on one occasion the audience started singing the tune of Swiebertje when Doderer got on stage. In the Netherlands, this effect of typecasting became known as the Swiebertje-effect. Doderer even moved to England and for four years he performed in high-quality television dramas. In 1979, he played a South African agent in The Human Factor, by Otto Preminger, together with Richard Attenborough, Derek Jacobi and John Gielgud.

In the 1990s Doderer finally succeeded in shedding his comedian image, and he played serious roles in Dutch theaters under the direction of Ivo van Hove and Ger Thijs.

Filmography

References

External links

 Doderer was ook groot in drama.

1921 births
2005 deaths
People from Velsen
Male actors from Amsterdam
Dutch male film actors
Dutch male stage actors
Dutch male television actors
Knights of the Order of Orange-Nassau